Juan Navarro is the name of:

 Juan Navarro Hispalensis (1530–1580), composer
 Juan Navarro Gaditanus (c. 1550–c. 1610), Franciscan friar and composer
 Juan Navarro Reverter (1844–1924), Spanish politician

 Juan Gil Navarro (born 1973), Argentinian TV actor
 Juan Carlos Navarro (basketball) (born 1980), nicknamed "La Bomba" (The Bomb)
 Juan Fernández Sánchez Navarro (born 1977), Mexican politician

See also
 Juan Navarro High School, Austin, Texas, US